Kalasin Town municipality Stadium or Kalasin Province Stadium is a multi-purpose stadium in Kalasin Province, Thailand. It is currently used mostly for football matches and is the home stadium of Kalasin F.C. The stadium holds 5,000 people.

Football venues in Thailand
Multi-purpose stadiums in Thailand